"Innocente (Falling in Love)" is the first single from Delerium's album Poem featuring singer Leigh Nash of the pop band Sixpence None the Richer.

After the huge success of the hit single "Silence" this song was also released with a trance remix by Lost Witness as the main radio version. For Belgium and Holland the remix by DJ Tiësto was used as radio version.
Other official remixes were done by Mr. Sam and Deep Dish. A remix by Markus Schulz was never released officially.

A music video was also produced. It showed singer Leigh Nash walking and driving in Toronto and a few couples falling in love. Two versions were edited, one to the Lost Witness Remix and another to an edit of the DJ Tiësto Remix.

Track listing
 US Single - 2001
 "Innocente" (Lost Witness Remix Radio Edit) - 3:33
 "Innocente" (Deep Dish Gladiator Remix) - 12:00
 "Innocente" (DJ Tiësto Remix) - 7:27
 "Innocente" (Lost Witness Remix) - 8:32
 "Innocente" (Mr. Sam's The Space Between Us Remix) - 10:23

 UK Cd Single 1 - 2001
 "Innocente" (Lost Witness Remix Radio Edit) - 3:33
 "Innocente" (Deep Dish Gladiator Remix) (UK Edit) - 10:59
 "Innocente" (Album Version Edit) - 4:27

 UK Cd Single 2 - 2001
 "Innocente" (Lost Witness Remix) - 8:32
 "Innocente" (DJ Tiësto Remix) - 7:27
 "Innocente" (Mr. Sam's The Space Between Us Remix Edit) - 3:55

 Benelux Cd Single - 2001
 "Innocente" (DJ Tiësto Remix Radio Edit) - 4:20
 "Innocente" (DJ Tiësto Remix) - 7:27

 Benelux Cd-Maxi - 2001
 "Innocente" (DJ Tiësto Remix) - 7:27
 "Innocente" (Mr. Sam's The Space Between Us Remix) - 10:23
 "Innocente" (Deep Dish Gladiator Remix) (UK Edit) - 10:59
 "Innocente" (Lost Witness Remix) - 8:32
 "Innocente" (Album Version Edit) - 4:27

 Australia CD-Single - 2001
 "Innocente" (Lost Witness Remix Radio Edit) - 3:25
 "Innocente" (Lost Witness Remix) - 8:30
 "Innocente" (Deep Dish Gladiator Remix) (UK Edit) - 10:55
 "Innocente" (DJ Tiësto Remix) - 7:20
 "Innocente" (Mr. Sam's The Space Between Us Remix) - 10:15

Charts

References

2001 singles
2000 songs
Delerium songs
Leigh Nash songs
Nettwerk Records singles
Songs written by Bill Leeb